Antonio Rizzi (Trieste, 5 January 1998) is an Italian rugby union player.
His usual position is as a fly-half and he currently plays for Zebre in Pro14.

In the 2018-19 and 2019–20 Pro14 seasons, he played for Benetton.

He played for the Italy Under 20 team, from 2016 to 2018. On 8 November 2021 he was named in the Italy A squad for the 2021 end-of-year rugby union internationals.

In January 2020 Rizzi was named in the Italian squad for the 2020 Six Nations Championship.

References

External Links
It's rugby France profile
Eurosport Profile

1998 births
Living people
Italian rugby union players
Rugby union fly-halves
Petrarca Rugby players
Benetton Rugby players
Zebre Parma players
Sportspeople from Trieste